"Anchor" is a song by Australian alternative rock band Birds of Tokyo. The song was included on the Extended Play (EP) of the same name. Sales towards the song counted towards the EP, which peaked at number 23 and was certified platinum in Australia.
The song came in at number 72 on the Triple J Hottest 100, 2015.

Band member Ian Kenny said "This is a song the band wrote while we were overseas touring and doing our thing. One thing we realised is that when you spend so long away from your friends and family and the people you love, you can kind of lose touch with exactly how people are doing and what’s really going on in their world, with a varied sort of outcomes - some good, some bad. So this is homage, bit of a tribute song to the times we didn’t notice how the people we love were really doing."

Reviews
Jamie Parmenter from Renowned for Sound said; ""Anchor builds" in with sombre tones and snaps to create images of California embodied in music. Front man Ian Kenny has really thrown himself in the deep end here, creating a sound that's almost like homage to early 80's American rock. This is all set against heartbreaking lyrics of chasing ghosts and finding loneliness, creating a track of strange but satisfying presence."

Music video
The official music video for "Anchor" was released on 10 May 2015
An additional music video was released on VEVO on 2 July 2015, showing the band performing the song live in the studio.

Track listing
 Digital Download
 "Anchor" - 3:36

References

Birds of Tokyo songs
2015 songs
2015 singles
EMI Records singles